Bulgaria – South Korea relations are foreign relations between the Bulgaria and South Korea.  Both countries re-established diplomatic relations on March 23, 1990.  During the Cold War, Bulgaria had diplomatic relations only with North Korea. Bulgaria has an embassy in Seoul. South Korea has an embassy in Sofia.

See also 
 Foreign relations of Bulgaria
 Foreign relations of South Korea
 South Korea–European Union relations

External links
  Bulgarian embassy in Seoul
  South Korean Ministry of Foreign Affairs and Trade about relations with Bulgaria
  South Korean embassy in Sofia

 
Korea, South 
Bilateral relations of South Korea